The 2001–02 European Challenge Cup pool stage (known as the Parker Pen Shield for sponsorship reasons) was the opening stage of the sixth season of the European Challenge Cup, the second-tier competition for European rugby union clubs. It began when Connacht hosted Narbonne on 28 September 2001 and ended with four matches on 13 January 2002.

Thirty two teams participated in this phase of the competition; they were divided into eight pools of four teams each, with each team playing the others home and away. Competition points were award for games won (2 points) and drawn (1 point).  There were no points for losing, nor were there bonus points as in the more modern bonus point system. The eight pool winners advanced to the knockout stage. These teams then competed in a single-elimination tournament that ended with the final at the Kassam Stadium in Oxford on 26 May 2002.

Results
All kickoff times are local to the match location.

{| class="wikitable"
|+ Key to colours
|-
| style="background: #ccffcc;" |     
| Winner of each pool, advance to quarterfinals. Seed # in parentheses
|}

Pool 1

Pool 2

Pool 3

 Parma refused to travel. Pontypridd were awarded the match points.

Pool 4

Pool 5

Pool 6

Pool 7

Pool 8

See also
European Challenge Cup
2001–02 Heineken Cup

References

pool stage
2001-02